Alina Fernández Revuelta (born 19 March 1956, Cuba)<ref>Fernández, Alina [https://books.google.com/books?id=sEyNcwa_3l4C&dq=Alina+Fernandez+born&pg=PA6 Castro's Daughter: An Exile's Memoir of Cuba’’] (St. Martin's Griffin , 1999) ISBN 978-0312242930. Page 14</ref> is a Cuban anti-communist activist. She is the daughter of Fidel Castro and Natalia Revuelta Clews. She is one of the best known Cuban critics of the government of Cuba and her father's and uncle's rule, where she lived until 1993.

Biography
Fernández lived with her mother, Natalia "Naty" Revuelta Clews, who was born in Havana in 1925 and stepfather, Orlando Fernández. In Cuba, she worked as a model and public relations director of a Cuban fashion company, according to the University Program Board. In 1993, at age 37, she left Cuba for Spain using false papers and a wig. Elena Díaz-Verson Amos, a Cuban immigrant, and wife to John Amos (an Aflac, Inc. founder) helped Fernández leave Cuba. Fernández lived in Columbus, Georgia, with Díaz-Verson for several years.

Fernández has one daughter. In an interview in 2008 with Foreign Policy magazine, she said she had been closer to her uncle, Raúl Castro, than she was to her father. She said Raúl Castro, who succeeded her father as the Cuban president, had helped her on several occasions. "He was the person to whom you could go to and ask for help every time you had a practical problem. I personally asked for his help a couple of times, and he always helped me immediately. In the family he was the only help you could find. On these kinds of issues, Fidel was totally unhelpful."

Lawsuit
Fernández's aunt, Juanita Castro, sued Alina Fernández for libel and defamation over passages in her autobiography about Juanita and Fidel's parents, Ángel Castro and Lina Ruz. In 2005, a Spanish court ordered Fernández and Plaza & Janes, the Barcelona Random House publisher, to pay US$45,000 to Juanita Castro, who said the book defamed her family: "People who were eating off Fidel's plate yesterday come here and want money and power, so they say whatever they want, even if it's not true... Part of my family was responsible for a lot of suffering in Cuba — you can't change that," she said. "But nobody has the right to offend Fidel's family. Insult Fidel — there's plenty to say." An English version, published under the title Castro's Daughter: An Exile's Memoir of Cuba, omits the offending passages.

References

External links
 Castro's Daughter Pleads for Her Own, The New York Times.

Book and autobiography
 Havana Dreams, a Story of Cuba by Wendy Gimbel (Alfred A. Knopf, 1998) 
 Castro's Daughter, An Exile's Memoir of Cuba'' by Alina Fernández (St. Martin's Press, 1997) 

1956 births
Living people
Cuban anti-communists
Cuban emigrants to the United States
Fidel Castro family
Opposition to Fidel Castro
People from Havana
Cuban exiles
Children of national leaders